The Sameura Dam (早明浦ダム Sameura-damu) is a dam on the Yoshino River on the island of Shikoku, Japan, completed in 1975. It has the largest storage capacity in Shikoku. The dam holds back a reservoir, named Lake Sameura (さめうら湖 Sameura-ko)

The dam is used for flood control, a source of irrigation, and provides tap water to surrounding areas. It also produces electricity using hydropower. The plant can generate 42 MW.

1994 Grumman A-6 Intruder Incident
 On October 14, 1994, a US Navy training plane, the Grumman A-6 Intruder, crashed near the reservoir. The A-6 Intruder took off from NAF Atsugi in Kanagawa Prefecture, and was headed towards MCAS Iwakuni in Yamaguchi Prefecture. The plane crashed on a low-level flight following a river when it got to a bend and couldn't get out. The wing sliced into the water upon a reverse. Both pilots, Lt. Eric A. Hamm and B/N John J. Dunne, Jr., were killed in the crash.

Water Supply Crisis of 2005
 The Sameura Dam supplies water to Takamatsu, Kagawa Prefecture and Tokushima Prefecture. In 2005, because of little rainfall and a series of dry spells from April to June, the Shikoku Region was hit by a very serious drought and Lake Sameura dried up twice. Luckily, they could get over this crisis thanks to the heavy rain brought Typhoon Nabi.

References 

Dams in Kōchi Prefecture
Hydroelectric power stations in Japan
Gravity dams
Dams completed in 1975